Belgrave is a historic village in Cheshire, England. The area is part of the estates owned the Dukes of Westminster who have their seat at Eaton Hall, Cheshire.  The village has a few houses and the Grosvenor Garden Centre. Belgrave Lodge is located at the western end of the  main approach to Eaton Hall, which is known as the Belgrave Avenue.

The village is also one of the Duke of Westminster's subsidiary titles, Viscount Belgrave (1784) which is the name of Belgravia in London, which was developed in the 1820s by Thomas Cubitt on land originally owned by Richard Grosvenor, 2nd Marquess of Westminster. Belgravia, which is one of the capital's most expensive districts, is characterised by grand terraces of white stucco properties. Many of the street names of Belgravia have a local connection to Cheshire such as Eaton Square (Eaton Hall), Chester Square (Chester), Kinnerton Street (Lower Kinnerton), and Eccleston Place (Eccleston).

References

Villages in Cheshire